Old (previously Wold and before that Wolde) is a village and civil parish in West Northamptonshire, England. At the time of the 2001 census, the parish's population was 308 people, and the population increased to 490 at the 2011 Census.

It is near the village of Walgrave, and has a church, village hall, pub and park. It was once home to the haulage company Knights of Old, but they are now based in Kettering. As with many villages the number of farms has decreased; two shops, a blacksmith, a butcher and a second pub also disappeared.

History
The village's name means 'High forest'.

Old is an ancient community, known in 1086 as Walda in the ancient domesday hundred of Mawsley.

The village was the beneficiary of a large legacy left to it by the Rev. John Tounson, a previous rector of the parish several hundred years ago, and each year various needy residents of the village receive supplements. In 1971, it was reported that the small plot of land bequeathed by the Rev. Tounson had been sold for £238,000.

Robert Woodford, the noted 17th-century diarist, was born at Old in 1606, a son of Robert Woodford and his wife Jane Dexter. He appears to have grown up in the parish.

Notable buildings 
The Historic England website contains details of a total of 19 listed buildings (all Grade II, apart from St Andrew's Church which is Grade I) and one scheduled monument at or in the vicinity of Old. Amongst them are:
St Andrew's Church, Church Lane
Corner House, Bridle Road
Dial House, Faxton End
Faxton House, Faxton End
The Old Rectory, Harrington Road
Wold Farmhouse, Harrington Road
The Brewery House, Harrington Road
Kites Hall, Mill Lane
Old Lodge, Mill Lane
Manor House, Walgrave Road

References

External links 

Villages in Northamptonshire
West Northamptonshire District
Civil parishes in Northamptonshire